Manly may refer to:

 Manly, an adjective corresponding to man
 Masculinity, a set of attributes generally associated with boys and men

Places

Australia
 Manly, New South Wales, a suburb of Sydney
 Manly Council, a former local government area in Sydney
 Electoral district of Manly, an electorate in the NSW State Government
 Manly Beach, a beach
 Manly, Queensland, a suburb of Brisbane
 Manly railway station
 Electoral district of Manly (Queensland), an electoral district from 1986 to 1992

United States
 Manly, Iowa, a city
 Manly, North Carolina, an unincorporated community
 Lake Manly, a former rift lake in California, US

New Zealand
 Manly, New Zealand, a suburb on the Whangaparaoa Peninsula north of Auckland

Sports
 Manly Warringah Sea Eagles, a team in the Australian National Rugby League
 Wynnum Manly Seagulls, a rugby league team in Brisbane, Australia
 Manly RUFC, a rugby union team in Manly, New South Wales, Australia

Other uses
 Manly (name), a surname and a given name
 Mr. Manly, an American radio program
 Manly Daily, an Australian newspaper covering areas near Manly
 SS Manly, a steam ferry that operated on Sydney Harbour between 1896 and 1924
 MV Manly (1965), a hydrofoil ferry which operated on Sydney Harbour

See also
 Manly Hospital, Sydney, Australia
 Little Boy from Manly, a national personification of New South Wales and later Australia
 Manley (disambiguation)
 Manliness (disambiguation)